The 2014 Jersey general election was held on 15 October 2014 to elect the 49 members of the States Assembly which also coincided with a referendum on electoral reform.

Electoral system
At the time of the election, the 49 members of the States consisted of three different types of members. The 29 deputies were elected from 18 districts; nine districts elected one deputy, five districts elected two deputies, two districts elected three deputies, and two districts elected four deputies, with voters able to cast as many votes as there were seats in their district. The 12 constables were elected, one from each of the 12 parishes, whilst the eight senators are elected on an island-wide basis, with each voter casting up to eight votes.

Results

Senators

Constables

Deputies

References

External links

2014
2014 elections in Europe
2014 in Jersey
October 2014 events in Europe